Leason Hill railway station served the area of Newmill of Inshewan, Angus, Scotland, from 1838 to 1847 on the Newtyle, Eassie and Glamiss Railway.

History 
The station opened on 4 June 1838 by the Newtyle, Eassie and Glamiss Railway. It was short-lived, only being open for 9 years before closing in October 1847.

References

External links 

Disused railway stations in Angus, Scotland
Railway stations in Great Britain opened in 1838
Railway stations in Great Britain closed in 1847
1838 establishments in Scotland
1847 disestablishments in Scotland